Mr. Hood is the debut studio album by hip hop group KMD. It was released on May 14, 1991 via Elektra Records. Recording sessions took place at Calliope Studios in New York. Production was handled by K.M.D., except two tracks produced by the Stimulated Dummies. The album spawned three singles: "Peachfuzz", which peaked at #11 on the Hot Rap Songs, "Who Me?", which peaked at #19 on the Hot Rap Songs, and "Nitty Gritty" featuring Brand Nubian.

The album reached number 67 on the Billboard Top R&B Albums chart in the United States and was ranked at number 98 on Pitchfork's Top 100 Favorite Albums of the 1990s.

Track listing

Personnel
Daniel Dumile – main artist, performer (tracks: 1-2, 6-11, 13-15, 17-18), producer
Alonzo Hodge – main artist, performer (tracks: 3, 6, 9, 15, 17-18), producer
Dingilizwe Dumile – main artist, performer (tracks: 5-6, 9, 17-18), producer
Maxwell Dixon – featured artist, performer (track 9)
Lorenzo Dechalus – featured artist, performer (track 9)
Derek Murphy – featured artist, performer (track 9)
John Gamble – producer (tracks: 3, 6), engineering
Dante Ross – producer (tracks: 3, 6), A&R
John 'Geeby' Dajani – producer (tracks: 3, 6)
Michael Berrin – executive producer
Peter J. Nash – executive producer
Thomas Coyne – mastering
Carol Bobolts – art direction
Arthur Cohen – photography
Arthur Leipzig – photography

Charts

References

External links

MF Doom albums
1991 debut albums
Elektra Records albums
Albums produced by Dante Ross
Albums produced by John Gamble (record producer)